Thomas Owen Morris (1845–1924) was an American Democratic politician. He was the mayor of Nashville, Tennessee from 1906 to 1908.

Early life
Morris was born in Sumner County, Tennessee on August 2, 1845.

Career
Morris served as Mayor of Nashville from 1906 to 1908. He was a member of the Knights Templar.

Personal life and death
Morris was married in Nashville on May 27, 1866 to Mary Snow. They had five children: Henry Snow, Edwin Lanier, Thomas Owen, Jr., Kitty and Kendrick J. Morris. He died in Nashville on November 8, 1924. He is buried at Mount Olivet Cemetery in Nashville.

References

1845 births
1924 deaths
People from Sumner County, Tennessee
Tennessee Democrats
Mayors of Nashville, Tennessee
Burials at Mount Olivet Cemetery (Nashville)